Antonella Serra Zanetti  (born 25 July 1980) is a retired female tennis player from Italy.

On 30 January 2006, Serra Zanetti achieved her career-high singles ranking of world No. 60. On 8 May 2006, she peaked at No. 47 in the doubles rankings. In her career, she won two WTA doubles titles, as well as six singles titles and five doubles titles on the ITF Women's Circuit.

Personal
Antonella was coached by Patricio Remondegui, her favorite surface is hard court. Father Alessandro is in banking; mother Arianna is an art history teacher; older brother Andrea and younger sister Alessia are students. Older sister Adriana also retired as professional tennis player.

Antonella Serra Zanetti retired from the professional tour 2009.

WTA career finals

Singles: 1 (1 runner-up)

Doubles: 2 (2 titles)

ITF finals

Singles (6–3)

Doubles (5–10)

External links
 
 
 

1980 births
Living people
Italian female tennis players
Sportspeople from Modena